The 2010 Senate election in the Philippines occurred on May 10, 2010 to elect one-half of the Senate. The senators elected in 2010, together with those elected on 2007, will comprise the Senate's delegation in the 15th Congress.

The canvassing of votes for senator was done in record time, attributed partly to the use precinct count optical scanner voting machines; the voting machines were used in a national election for the time, and proclamation for the first nine winners was done five days after Election Day, while the latter three's was done three days later. all incumbents that ran successfully defended their seats, with four former senators and two new senators being elected.

Manner of election
Voting for senators is via nationwide, at-large basis via plurality-at-large voting system. A voter has twelve votes: the voter can vote less than twelve but not more than it. Then votes are tallied nationwide and the twelve candidates with the highest number of votes are elected to the Senate. The Commission on Elections administers elections for the Senate, with the Senate Electoral Tribunal deciding election disputes after a Senator has taken office.

Senators elected in 2010
Key: Boldface: incumbent, italicized: neophyte senator
*Senators are elected on a nationwide, at-large basis.

See also
List of representatives elected in the Philippine House of Representatives elections, 2010

2010 Philippine general election